Vachellia anegadensis, the pokemeboy, is a species of plant in the family Fabaceae. It is found only in the British Virgin Islands. Its natural habitats are subtropical or tropical dry forests, subtropical or tropical dry shrubland, sandy shores, and rural gardens. It is threatened by habitat loss.

References

anegadensis
Flora of the British Virgin Islands
Taxonomy articles created by Polbot